Yahyakhel District is a district of Paktika Province, Afghanistan.

References 

Districts of Paktika Province